Events in the year 1663 in India.

Events
January 23 – The Treaty of Ghilajharighat is signed in India between representatives of the Mughal Empire and the independent Ahom Kingdom (in what is now the Assam state), with the Mughals ending their occupation of the Ahom capital of Garhgaon, in return for payment by Ahom in silver and gold for costs of the occupation, and King Sutamla of Ahom sending one of his daughters to be part of the harem of Mughal Emperor Aurangzeb.
March 4 – The Prince Edward Islands in the sub-antarctic Indian Ocean are discovered by Barent Barentszoon Lam, of the Dutch ship Maerseveen, and named Dina (Prince Edward) and Maerseveen (Marion).
Rise of the Travancore Kingdom - The first maharaja of the Travancore Kingdom, His Highness Rama Varma I was sworned in.

Births

Deaths
Bihari Lal, poet (b.1595).

 
India
Years of the 17th century in India